The Polaris Program is a planned human spaceflight program organized by businessman and commercial astronaut Jared Isaacman. Isaacman, who commanded the first all-civilian Inspiration4 spaceflight in September 2021, purchased flights from SpaceX in order to create the Polaris Program. The first two flights will use the SpaceX Crew Dragon spacecraft, while the third flight is planned to be the first crewed Starship flight. Polaris Dawn, the first flight, will attempt the first private spacewalk.

NASA and SpaceX signed in September 2022 with the Polaris program an unfunded Space Act Agreement to study the feasibility of a SpaceX and Polaris Program mission to boost the Hubble Space Telescope into a higher orbit with the Crew Dragon.

Flights

References

2020s in spaceflight
2022 establishments in the United States
Human spaceflight programs
Private spaceflight
SpaceX